The Swedish Chess Computer Association (SSDF) is an organization that tests computer chess software by playing chess programs against one another and producing a rating list. On September 26, 2008, the list was released with Deep Rybka 3 leading with an estimated Elo rating of 3238. Rybka's listing in June 2006 was the first time a program on the list has passed the 2900 mark. In the year 2000 the ratings of the chess engines in the SSDF rating pool were calibrated with games played against humans.

The SSDF list is one of the only statistically significant measures of chess engine strength, especially compared to tournaments, because it incorporates the results of thousands of games played on standard hardware at tournament time controls. The list reports not only absolute rating, but also error bars, winning percentages, and recorded moves of played games.

The SSDF's current testing platform includes an AMD Ryzen 7 1800X 8-Core 3.6 GHz with 16 GB of RAM-memory and a 64-bit operating system. On this platform they have chosen to add the 6 piece Syzygy endgame database, installed on SSD, for the programs that are able to use it. From 1984 to 2020, the SSDF top program increased by 1942 points, an average of 54 points per year.

Rating list year-end leaders

See also
Chess engine rating lists
Chess Engines Grand Tournament (CEGT)

Notes

References
 Swedish Chess Computer Association
 PLY/SSDF – the story
 Rating of Best PC Chess Program
 Chess Computer Museum (M.E.C.A Museo Español Computadoras Ajedrez)

Sports organizations established in 1984
Computer chess
Chess organizations
Chess in Sweden